The Duma of Chukotka Autonomous Okrug is the regional parliament of the Chukotka Autonomous Okrug, a federal subject of Russia in the far east of the country. Together with the executive and judicial branches, the okrug's duma (assembly) is vested with power to control the okrug's own affairs with high levels of autonomy from Moscow. All members are elected by public vote and are titled as deputies. Deputies currently have a five-year term.

History
Prior to the dissolution of the Soviet Union, the Supreme Soviet of RSFSR (Russian Soviet Federative Socialist Republic) was the legislative body of the Soviet Union that was elected by members of the Congress of People's Deputies of Russia. The Supreme Soviet contained the Council of the Republic and the Council of Nationalities, which represented the population size of the federal subjects. Until 1990, Chukotka was administrated under Magadan Oblast, but a law passed that year allowed this arrangement to be altered. Chukotka declared its administrative independence from Magadan Oblast to join the Russian Federation as an autonomous okrug.

During the Russian constitutional crisis of 1993, the legislative body of Russia was dissolved and power was decentralized to the individual federal subjects by a presidential decree ( 1617). Due to this, on 11 January 1994, another new decree was established to name the new local legislative body in Chukotka as the Duma of Chukotka Autonomous Okrug. Initially, the body had two chambers: an upper house with nine deputies, and a lower house with six deputies. The first legislative election was scheduled for 10 April 1994 to elect deputies for two-year terms.

Of Russia's 85 federal subjects, the Chukotka Autonomous Okrug ranks seventh by land area and 84th by population; it also is the least-densely populated (as of 2010 census). Approximately half of its population are Chukchis or other indigenous peoples.

Structure
The Chukotka Autonomous Okrug Duma is unicameral, like most legislative assembly bodies of Russian federal subjects. It currently comprises 15 deputies, with 6 of them running in multi-seat constituencies and the other 9 in single electoral districts. Deputies are elected every 5 years by public vote, in which winners are determined by a combination of first-past-the-post voting and party-list proportional representation, in what is known as the parallel voting system. The duma also internally elects a legislative representative to the Federation Council, which is the upper house of Russia's legislative branch.

The executive branch of Chukotka works closely with the duma. The executive branch is also known as the government of Chukotka and is headed by the governor, who is the highest-ranking person in the okrug. The governor is not to be confused with the chairman of the duma, who is head of the duma only and chosen from amongst the deputies.

Elections

2021

List of chairmen

Previous legislative assemblies

References

Government of Russia
Legislatures of the federal subjects of Russia
Politics of Chukotka Autonomous Okrug